Samantha Robinson (born October 19, 1991) is an American actress. She is known for playing the lead role in the film The Love Witch, directed by Anna Biller. Her other roles include coffee heiress Abigail Folger in the 2019 film Once Upon a Time in Hollywood, directed by Quentin Tarantino.

Early life
Samantha Robinson was born on October 19, 1991 in New York City to a Panamanian mother and an English father. She was raised in London, England. She attended the all girls' school Queen's Gate in South Kensington and the London Academy of Music and Dramatic Art. Robinson landed a role in the West End production of Joseph and the Amazing Technicolor Dreamcoat. At the age of 14, her family relocated to Miami, Florida, where she attended the New World School of the Arts. Robinson later graduated from the University of California, Los Angeles with a concentration in acting in 2014.

Career
Robinson's early roles included the independent films Serenade of Sonnets, Dreamgirl, and Labyrinths.

Her breakthrough came in 2016 with the lead role as Elaine, a seductive witch, in the film The Love Witch directed by Anna Biller. Robinson earned acclaim for her role in The Love Witch. Frank Scheck, writing for The Hollywood Reporter, called Robinson's performance "intense" and "alluring in a way that goes far beyond her lithe dancer's body and stunning looks." Variety's Dennis Harvey said Robinson "does a great job encapsulating another era’s kitten-with-a-whip affectations." Charles Bramesco wrote in Rolling Stone that director Biller and Robinson "have created a three-dimensional version of the stock eroticized woman." IndieWire's David Ehrlich labeled Robinson's role "unforgettable" and "a breakthrough performance for the ages." The LA Times film critics Justin Chang and Michael Rechtshaffen called Robinson "superb" and "simultaneously channeling Tippi Hedren and '60s scream queen Barbara Steele," respectively. Elle magazine called Robinson's performance "pitch-perfect," while The Nerdist reviewer Scott Weinberg said that Robinson "owns the whole movie," and that her performance was "brave, sexy, (and) commanding." The New Yorker ranked Robinson as one of the best actresses of 2016 for her role in The Love Witch.

Robinson played Abigail Folger, one of the victims of the Tate-LaBianca murders, in the 2019 film Once Upon a Time in Hollywood directed by Quentin Tarantino.

Filmography

Film

Television

References

External links

 

1991 births
21st-century American actresses
American film actresses
Living people
People educated at Queen's Gate School
Alumni of the London Academy of Music and Dramatic Art
University of California, Los Angeles alumni
American people of English descent
American people of Panamanian descent
Hispanic and Latino American actresses